Nanna Devaru is a 1982 Kannada-language film, directed by B. Mallesh and produced by K. S. Ashok. The story was written by R. Selvaraj. The film stars Ananth Nag, Sujatha (in her Kannada debut), Tiger Prabhakar and K. S. Ashwath. Actress Jayanthi appeared in a brief cameo role. The film's score and songs were composed by Rajan–Nagendra, whilst the cinematography was by B. C. Gowrishankar. Rajkumar makes an entry during a wedding scene and blesses Ananth Nag and Sujatha.

Cast 
 Ananth Nag 
 Sujatha
 Tiger Prabhakar 
 Jayanthi
 K. S. Ashwath
 Vajramuni
 Musuri Krishnamurthy
 Jayamalini
 M. S. Umesh
 Dinesh
 Sundar Raj
 Dingri Nagaraj
 K. Vijaya
 B. Jaya

Soundtrack 
The music was composed by Rajan–Nagendra duo, with lyrics by Chi. Udaya Shankar.

References

External links 

 Nanna Devaru online HD

1982 films
1980s Kannada-language films
Indian drama films
Films scored by Rajan–Nagendra
Films directed by B. Mallesh